Anders Erik Lundin (born 8 September 1958) is a Swedish television host, comedian and lyricist. Lundin was one of the first hosts in the world to host the show Expedition Robinson, also known as Survivor.

Lundin co-hosted the Eurovision Song Contest 2000 along with Kattis Ahlström and, 2003–10, was every summer host for the successful song show Allsång på Skansen. He has also hosted the show Allt för Sverige which takes Americans to Sweden to learn more about their Swedish ancestry.

See also
 List of Eurovision Song Contest presenters

References

External links

Info on Anders Lundin

1958 births
Swedish television hosts
Living people
Entertainers from Stockholm
Swedish comedians
Swedish schoolteachers